Vladan Bubanja (Cyrillic: Владан Бубања; born 21 February 1999) is a Montenegrin professional footballer who plays as a defensive midfielder for Croatian Football League club Lokomotiva.

Club career
A youth product of Sutjeska since 2009, Bubanka began his senior career with them in 2017. On 16 January 2021, he extended his contract with Sutjeska. On 16 June 2022 after 118 games and three titles with Sutjeska, he transferred to the Croatian club Lokomotiva.

International career
Bubanja is a youth international for Montenegro, having played up to the Montenegro U21s. In May 2022, he was first called up to the senior Montenegro national team for a set of UEFA Nations League matches.

Honours

Sutjeska
Montenegrin First League: 2017–18, 2018–19, 2021–22

References

External links
 
 FSCG Profile

1999 births
Living people
Footballers from Nikšić
Montenegrin footballers
Montenegro under-21 international footballers
Montenegro youth international footballers
Association football midfielders
FK Sutjeska Nikšić players
NK Lokomotiva Zagreb players
Montenegrin First League players
Croatian Football League players
Montenegrin expatriate footballers
Montenegrin expatriate sportspeople in Croatia
Expatriate footballers in Croatia